An attacker is someone who attacks or a type of player in some sports.

For the term attacker in computer security, see Hacker (computer security), Adversary (cryptography), and Adversary model.
Attacker may also refer to:

 Attacker-class escort carrier, a class of escort aircraft carriers of the British Royal Navy
 Attacker-class patrol boat, a class of British-built patrol boats
 , more than one ship of the British Royal Navy
 Supermarine Attacker, a British aircraft

See also
 Attack (disambiguation)
 Attackers